Patriarch Joannicius may refer to:

 Joannicius I of Constantinople, Ecumenical Patriarch in 1524–1525
 Patriarch Joannicius of Alexandria, Greek Patriarch of Alexandria in 1645–1657
 Joannicius II of Constantinople, Ecumenical Patriarch in 	1646–1648, 1651–1652, 1653–1654 and 1655–1656
 Joannicius III of Constantinople, Ecumenical Patriarch in 1761–1763